Lucio Sordoni (born 23 July 1998) is an Argentina international rugby union player. He plays for Glasgow Warriors in the United Rugby Championship.

Rugby Union career

Amateur career

Sordoni started played rugby union for Club Atlético del Rosario. He has also played for Southern Districts in Australia.

Professional career

Sordoni played for the Jaguares. On 28 December 2018, Sordoni was named in the Jaguares squad for the 2019 Super Rugby season.

Sordoni played for the Melbourne Rebels in 2021.

Sordoni was signed by French club Mont de Marsan in 2022 but did not play due to injury.

On 3 August 2022 Sordoni was signed by Glasgow Warriors in a short term deal.

Super Rugby statistics

International career

Sordoni played for Argentina in the 2020 Rugby Championship.

References

External links
 

Jaguares (Super Rugby) players
Rugby union props
Argentine rugby union players
1998 births
Living people
Club Atlético del Rosario rugby union players
Argentina international rugby union players
Expatriate rugby union players in Australia
Argentine expatriate rugby union players
Melbourne Rebels players
Glasgow Warriors players
Expatriate rugby union players in Scotland